Zrinko is a Slavic name of Croatian origin and is derived from the name of the place Zrin which is situated in the region of Banovina, Croatia. 

This name may refer to:

Zrinko Ogresta, a Croatian film director
Zrinko Tutić, a Croatian songwriter

See also
 Croatian name
 Slavic names

Croatian masculine given names
Slavic masculine given names